Monte Tuttavista is a limestone massif located in the comune of Galtellì, in central-eastern Sardinia.

The vegetation cover consists of a mixed association of broad-leaved and coniferous trees with a prevalence of cork oak, holm oak, strawberry tree, phillyrea, mastic, myrtle, olive and the presence of Aleppo pine and domestic pine of artificial origin.
Due to its remarkable environmental value, a large part of the mountain is incorporated in a forestry site managed by the Forestry Authority of Sardinia.

Sources

Tuttavista
Province of Nuoro